The Deutsche Jazzpreis, also known as the Albert Mangelsdorff-Preis, is, together with the Hans Koller Preis, the most important jazz award in the German-speaking region. Since 1994, it has been awarded every two years by the  Union Deutscher Jazzmusiker. 

Named after Albert Mangelsdorff, the European jazz scene's best-known trombonist, it is endowed with 15,000 Euro by the GEMA foundation. 

The Deutsche Jazzpreis was awarded for the eleventh time at the JazzFest Berlin '09.

Recipients
 1994 Alexander von Schlippenbach
 1995 Peter Kowald
 1997 Ernst-Ludwig Petrowsky
 1999 Heinz Sauer
 2001 Wolfgang Schlüter
 2003 Ulrike Haage
 2005 Ulrich Gumpert
 2007 Gunter Hampel
 2009 Eberhard Weber
 2011 Peter Brötzmann
 2013 Nils Wogram
 2015 Achim Kaufmann
 2017 Angelika Niescier
 2019 Paul Lovens
 2021 Aki Takase

External links
 

German music awards
Jazz awards